Paul Chesterton is an English actor based in Surrey.

Personal life
Chesterton was born in Harrow Wealdstone and grew up in South Africa (for 9 Years) and America (for 4 Years).

Career
Before starting his professional career, Chesterton trained at the Guildford School of Acting (GSA).  He also holds a BSC(Hons) in Economics from City University London.

Theatre
Chesterton's work in theatre includes: Present Laughter, The Alchemist and The Hour We Knew Nothing Of Each Other at the National Theatre, London; Dracula at Birmingham Rep and The Valkyrie for ENO.

Film
In film, he has appeared in Blenheim Palace - The Untold Story, One Night Fall and The Three Nails.

References

English male stage actors
Living people
Alumni of City, University of London
Year of birth missing (living people)
Alumni of the Guildford School of Acting